, is a 2006 Japanese kaiju film directed by Ryuta Tasaki, written by Yukari Tatsui, and produced by Kadokawa Daiei Studio. It is the 12th  entry in the Gamera film series, and serves as the second reboot of the franchise, with the first being Gamera: Guardian of the Universe in 1995. It is also the first entry in the series to be produced by Kadokawa Daiei Studio after the company purchased a percentage of the remaining assets of Daiei Film, the original studio that was responsible for making the Gamera films.

Gamera the Brave stars Ryo Tomioka, Kanji Tsuda, Kaho, and Susumu Terajima, and features Toshinori Sasaki as Toto, the son of the fictional giant turtle monster Gamera. The film was released theatrically in Japan on April 29, 2006, and was distributed by Shochiku.

Plot
In 1973, a young boy named Kousuke evacuates his home in the picturesque seaside city of Shima, Mie, which is under attack by a trio of bat-like Gyaos monsters, until a benign kaiju resembling a turtle, named Gamera intervenes to buy time for the evacuation. Unable to kill off all of the Gyaos, Gamera sacrifices itself in a self-destruct ability to end the threat of the Gyaos for good as Kousuke watches from the shores. The tale picks up 33 years later in 2006, with Kousuke as a grown man and widower with his son, Toru. Toru has friends, but has a fear of being left alone because he is plagued by memories of his late mother and Kousuke having to work so much to support the family. Toru's fears are intensified when he finds his friend and neighbor, Mai, has to undergo dangerous heart surgery. When his other friends, Katsuya and Ishimaru, take him out exploring to try and cheer him up, Toru discovers an unusual egg atop a red stone in the same place Gamera self-destructed decades ago. The egg hatches into a small tortoise Toru nicknames Toto, after what his mother used to call him. Toto begins to display remarkable abilities such as high intelligence, levitation, and breathing small bursts of fire; while growing at a rapid rate. The turtle quickly outgrows the house and is relocated by Toru and his friends to maintain secrecy. Toru also gives Mai the red stone he found Toto's egg on as a good luck charm for her heart surgery. However, after a storm, Toru finds Toto has left his hideaway and gone missing.

Concurrently, many shipping disasters occur in the area, the cause of which is the kaiju Zedus, a monstrous man-eating reptile which soon thereafter rampages through the city. It corners Toru, Kousuke, and Toru's friends, but the boy's former pet, now significantly larger, intercedes. The turtle is now clearly a young Gamera, Toto is wounded in the fight and captured by government officials. Privy to Gamera being benevolent creatures and knowing Zedus would return, the government has scientists who studied the previous Gamera work to help heal the wounded Toto. Keeping him in a warehouse, they bandage the unconscious young kaiju and hook the creature up to a machine which infuses it with liquid derived from mysterious red stones found in the vicinity of the past Gamera's self-destruction, which the scientists theorize give the Gamera their power. Mai's surgery is successful and her mother calls Kousuke and Toru to give the good news, but she also states Mai keeps muttering in her sleep that Toto needs the glowing stone.

Zedus attacks again and the now near fully grown Toto, now larger, goes out to battle him to save fleeing citizens. Toru and his friends determine that the still-immature Gamera must consume the red stone which Toru had found with the egg, a much larger and more concentrated form of the red beads the scientists had used, in order to gain its full power. Kousuke, having seen the damage a kaiju brawl can have first hand and not wanting to lose his son as he did his wife, initially opposes their efforts to get close to Toto; but comes around to help them after ensuring Katsuya and Ishimaru get to safety. Mai tries to reach them or Toto to deliver the red stone, but her post-surgery weakness inhibits her. The red stone however seems to connect to various children, whom come to Mai's aid and relay the stone across the city to Toru and his friends. Zedus, firmly having the upper-hand in the battle, hurls Toto into a skyscraper. Kousuke holds up debris to help Toru get into the building and Toru, after begging Toto not to die to save the day like his predecessor did, throws the red stone into Gamera's mouth during the battle. Gamera's power of jet-propelled flight manifests itself and it defeats Zedus by firing a charged-up fireball attack down Zedus' throat. The kaiju escapes further government investigation with Toru, Kousuke, and the other children's assistance. Watching his former pet fly off into the sky, Toru finally calls Toto by his true name and whispers, "Farewell, Gamera..."

Cast

Release
The film opened at #6 at the box office in Japan and became a commercial failure.

Reception 
Andrew Kasch of the website Dread Central gave the film a score of 3 1/2 out of 5, writing that "Even with its kid-centric approach, Gamera the Brave is guaranteed to please most kaiju enthusiasts, and the new franchise should be enough to fill the empty hole left in Godzilla's absence." Tom Mes of Midnight Eye called the film "an agreeable time waster that introduces the tried and true kaiju formula to a new generation", but wrote that "anyone aged 13 or over will likely be looking elsewhere for their monster movie fix".

In the years following the film's release, a hoax circulated online which claimed that a giant ancient tortoise, shown in photographs being transported on a flatbed truck, was caught in or around the Amazon River. In actuality, the tortoise shown in the photographs was a full-scale, 15-foot-long prop of Toto which was used in the film.

Home media
Gamera the Brave was released on Region 1 DVD in 2008 by Tokyo Shock. The film received a Blu-ray release in July 2016 by Kadokawa Daiei Studio, as part of a box set with 4K digital restorations of the previous films in the Gamera franchise's Heisei era.

It was also released by Arrow Video as part of their Gamera: The Complete Collection box set.

References

External links
 
 Gamera the Brave  at SciFi Japan

2006 films
2006 fantasy films
2000s monster movies
Films directed by Ryuta Tasaki
Gamera films
Kaiju films
Japanese sequel films
Films set in Nagoya
Films set in Shima
Giant monster films
2000s Japanese films